Grrr! It's Betty Boo is the second studio album by English singer Betty Boo, released on 12 October 1992 via WEA Records. This album failed to match the success of her debut studio album, Boomania (1990), stalling at No. 62 in the UK Albums Chart. The album did however garner one hit single with "Let Me Take You There", which peaked at No. 12 in the UK Singles Chart. Further singles from the album were "I'm on My Way", "Catch Me", "Thing Goin' On" and "Hangover". The record is dedicated to her father. The cover art is based on the iconic package of Tigra cigarettes. After this, Betty Boo retired from the music industry for several years.

Critical reception
Writing for The Guardian in October 1992, Adam Sweeting thought that the album contained "more than its fair share of garish artificial charm", surmising that although Boo's songs "hang on a thread of absurdity", presenting critics with an easy target, "her kittenish raps – usually about boys and boy-trouble – bristle with winningly daft rhymes". AllMusic's William Ruhlmann noted that "Boo raps through the verses and sings the choruses (...) in an engaging enough manner, but she never threatens to be more than a cartoon". Madonna praised the album in a 1994 interview with Q Magazine, describing it as "horribly ignored".

Track listing

Samples
 "I'm on My Way" contains an interpolation of "Lady Madonna", written by John Lennon and Paul McCartney. The saxophone line is not taken directly from The Beatles' original version, but is a re-creation featuring the same session players: Ronnie Scott, Harry Klein, Bill Povey and Bill Jackman.
 "Thing Goin' On" contains a sample of "Turn Off the Lights", written by Young, Logan & Saunders and performed by Larry Young's Fuel.
 "Let Me Take You There" contains a sample of "It's All in the Game", written by Charles Dawes and Carl Sigman, as performed by The Four Tops. The instrumental break contains a sample of "Pet Sounds", written by Brian Wilson and performed by The Beach Boys.
 "Close the Door" begins with a bass arrangement bearing strong similarities to Barry White's "I'm Gonna Love You Just a Little More Baby".

Personnel
Betty Boo – producer, pre-production, vocals

Additional musicians
Ronnie Scott – saxophone on track 1
Harry Klein – saxophone on track 1
Bill Povey – saxophone on track 1
Bill Jackman – saxophone on track 1
Gary Plumbley – saxophone on track 8
Guy Barker – flumpet on track 2
Richard Niles – string arrangement on track 3
Roger Rettig – pedal steel on track 3
Frank Ton Ton – drums on track 6
Michael Rosenberg – guitar on track 8
Sweet Paulino – percussion on track 8
Fenella Barton – strings on track 9
Sian Bell – strings on track 9
Sonia Shany – strings on track 9
Jocelyn Pook – strings on track 9

Technical personnel
 John Coxon – producer, pre-production "Done Upstairs"
 Mads Bjerke – recording, engineer on tracks 1–7 & 10 at The Strongroom
 Streets Ahead – producer on track 2
 Dean Ross – producer on tracks 8–9
 Sweet Paulino – producer on tracks 8–9
 Jim Abyss – recording on track 8 at Metropolis Studios, mix engineer on track 1 at Olympic Studios
 Ren Swan – recording on track 9 at Sarm East Studios
 Gregg Jackman – mix engineer on tracks 2–10 at Sarm West Studios

Charts

References

1992 albums
Betty Boo albums
Sire Records albums